Georgi Vangelov (born 29 July 1993) is a Bulgarian freestyle wrestler. He is a two-time bronze medalist at the European Wrestling Championships. He also represented Bulgaria at the 2020 Summer Olympics held in Tokyo, Japan.

Career 

In 2016, he won one of the bronze medals in the men's freestyle 57 kg event at the European Wrestling Championships held in Riga, Latvia.

In 2020, he won one of the bronze medals in the men's 61 kg event at the Individual Wrestling World Cup held in Belgrade, Serbia.

He lost his bronze medal match in the men's 57 kg event at the 2020 Summer Olympics held in Tokyo, Japan.

He won one of the bronze medals in the men's 61 kg event at the 2022 European Wrestling Championships held in Budapest, Hungary. He lost his bronze medal match in the 61kg event at the 2022 World Wrestling Championships held in Belgrade, Serbia.

Personal life 
Vangelov is married and has a daughter.

Achievements

References

External links 
 

Living people
1993 births
People from Radnevo
Bulgarian male sport wrestlers
European Wrestling Championships medalists
Wrestlers at the 2019 European Games
European Games competitors for Bulgaria
Wrestlers at the 2020 Summer Olympics
Olympic wrestlers of Bulgaria
21st-century Bulgarian people